This is a list of notable events in country music that took place in 1961.

Events

March 17 – September 22 — NBC-TV airs Five Star Jubilee, a weekly show featuring five rotating hosts: Rex Allen, Snooky Lanson, Tex Ritter, Carl Smith and Jimmy Wakely.
June 14 — Patsy Cline is seriously injured after a car accident. While in the hospital, the song "I Fall to Pieces" becomes a huge country-pop crossover hit.

No dates
The Country Music Association (CMA) develops and finalizes plans for the new Country Music Hall of Fame, to honor performers and others who were influential in the history of the genre. The first three inductees, honored on November 3, are all posthumous:
 Jimmie Rodgers, a songwriter who – despite poor health – merged hillbilly and blues music into a revolutionary new sound.
 Fred Rose, a pioneering song publisher who formed the Acuff-Rose music publishing company in the 1940s. Also a talented songwriter, and record producer/executive.
 Hank Williams, legendary singer-songwriter whose songs are still sought after today.
 With just a $1,500 budget, bronze plaques honoring each of the singers would be cast, a tradition that continues today.
Spade Cooley is arrested in connection with the beating death of his second wife, Ella Mae Evans. He is convicted and sentenced to prison. En route to prison, he suffers a heart attack, from which he will recover.

Top hits of the year

Number one hits

United States
(as certified by Billboard)

Notes
 No. 1 song of the year, as determined by Billboard.
 Song dropped from No. 1 and later returned to top spot.
 First Billboard No. 1 hit for that artist.
 Last Billboard No. 1 hit for that artist.
 Only Billboard No. 1 hit for that artist to date.

Other major hits

Top new album releases

Births
July 1 — Michelle Wright, country star of the 1990s; best known for the hit "Take It Like a Man".
July 8 — Toby Keith, country star of the 1990s who became a mega-superstar in the 2000s (decade), thanks to his fusion of honky tonk, love ballads and rock.
August 25 — Billy Ray Cyrus, honky-tonk heartthrob of the 1990s and 2000s (decade), thanks to the huge success of "Achy Breaky Heart".

Deaths
 September 20 – Karl Farr, member of the Sons of the Pioneers.

Country Music Hall of Fame Inductees
Jimmie Rodgers (1897–1933)
Fred Rose (1898–1954)
Hank Williams Sr. (1923–1953)

Major awards

Grammy Awards
Best Country and Western Recording — "Big Bad John", Jimmy Dean

See also
Country Music Association
Inductees of the Country Music Hall of Fame

Further reading
Kingsbury, Paul, "The Grand Ole Opry: History of Country Music. 70 Years of the Songs, the Stars and the Stories," Villard Books, Random House; Opryland USA, 1995
Kingsbury, Paul, "Vinyl Hayride: Country Music Album Covers 1947–1989," Country Music Foundation, 2003
Millard, Bob, "Country Music: 70 Years of America's Favorite Music," HarperCollins, New York, 1993
Whitburn, Joel, "Top Country Songs 1944–2005 – 6th Edition." 2005.

External links
Country Music Hall of Fame

Country
Country music by year